Short House may refer to:

in the United States (by state then town)
William A. Short House, Helena, Arkansas, listed on the National Register of Historic Places (NRHP) in Phillips County
Short-Dodson House, Hot Springs, Arkansas, listed on the NRHP in Garland County
Short Homestead, Georgetown, Delaware, listed on the NRHP in Sussex County, Delaware
O. F. Short House, Eagle, Idaho, listed on the NRHP in Ada County 
George Short House, Greenville, Kentucky, listed on the NRHP in Muhlenberg County, Kentucky

See also
Shorter House (disambiguation)